This article is one of a series providing information about endemism among birds in the world's various zoogeographic zones. For an overview of this subject see Endemism in birds.

Patterns of endemism 
Family-level endemism is prominent in Australia. The Australasian biogeographic region has the highest number of endemic families of any zoogeographic region except the Neotropics, and many of these families are endemic to Australia itself — the country therefore stakes a strong claim to be the world's greatest hotspot of bird endemism.

Australian endemic and near-endemic families 
The Australian endemic families are:
 Emu (Dromaiidae), a well-known monotypic family; the emu is found in rural areas throughout the continent
 Plains-wanderer (Pedionomidae), a monotypic family; plains-wanderer is restricted to arid inland areas in the southeast of Australia
 Lyrebirds (Menuridae), two forest-dwelling species of southeast Australia
 Scrub-birds (Atrichornithidae), two forest-dwelling species, one found in southeastern Australia, the other in southwest Australia
 Australian mudnesters (Struthideidae), two species found in open forest and woodland environments in eastern Australia
 Bristlebirds (Dasyornithidae), three species: eastern, western and rufous bristlebirds.
 Pardalotes (Pardalotidae), four species: spotted, forty-spotted, red-browed and striated pardalote

In addition to the families listed above, the following families are endemic to the Australasian region, with some of their species also found in New Guinea:

 Magpie goose (Anseranatidae), a monotypic family with a portion of the population living on New Guinea
 Australian treecreepers (Climacteridae), seven species, six endemic to Australia and one, the Papuan treecreeper, endemic to New Guinea.
 Bowerbirds (Ptilonorhynchidae), twenty species, ten found in Australia, eight in New Guinea, and two in both.
 Fairy-wrens, emu-wrens, and grasswrens (Maluridae), twenty-nine species, twenty-three endemic to Australia and six to New Guinea
 Australasian babblers (Pomatostomidae), four of the five species are endemic to Australia
 Logrunners (Orthonychidae), three species, two endemic to Australia and one to New Guinea
 Jewel-babblers and quail-thrushes (Cinclosomatidae), nine species, five Australian, four from New Guinea, sometimes broadened to Phosphodidae to include whipbirds and wedgebills (six species, five from Australia and one from New Guinea).
 Sittellas (Neosittidae), two species, the varied sittella of Australia and the black sittella of New Guinea
 Boatbills (Machaerirhynchidae), two species, Australia's yellow-breasted boatbill and New Guinea's black-breasted boatbill.

A further group of families endemic to the Australasian region, but where the species are predominantly New Guinea endemics are listed in the article on endemic birds of New Guinea.

Endemic Bird Areas 
BirdLife International has defined the following Endemic Bird Areas (EBAs) in Australia:

Christmas Island, an Australian territory, is also an EBA.

In addition the following are classified as secondary areas (areas with at least one restricted-range bird species, but not meeting the criteria to qualify as EBAs):

To be completed later.

List of species 
The following is a list of bird species endemic to Australia:

Species endemic to coastal eastern Australia

Species endemic to the Cape York peninsula 
 Buff-breasted buttonquail
 Golden-shouldered parrot
 White-streaked honeyeater

Species endemic to the Queensland wet tropics 

 Chowchilla
 Fernwren
 Atherton scrubwren
 Mountain thornbill
 Grey-headed robin
 Pied monarch
 Bower's shrike-thrush
 Bridled honeyeater
 Macleay's honeyeater
 Tooth-billed catbird
 Golden bowerbird
 Victoria's riflebird

Species endemic to eastern Australia 

 Black-breasted buttonquail
 Albert's lyrebird
 Rufous scrub-bird
 Eastern bristlebird
 Pilotbird
 Rockwarbler
 Green catbird
 Regent bowerbird
 Paradise riflebird

Species found in more than one of the above areas, but not elsewhere 

 Australian brushturkey
 Lovely fairywren (Cape York, Queensland wet tropics)
 Yellow-spotted honeyeater (Cape York, Queensland wet tropics)
 Pale-yellow robin (Queensland wet tropics, eastern Australia)

Species endemic to south-eastern Australia 

Many, but some include;

 Kangaroo Island emu (extinct)
 Powerful owl
 Gang-gang cockatoo
 Long-billed corella
 Turquoise parrot
 Superb lyrebird
 Pilotbird
 Musk lorikeet
 Rose robin

Species endemic to Tasmania 

 King Island emu (extinct)
 Tasmanian nativehen
 Green rosella
 Orange-bellied parrot (endemic as a breeding species, winters in south-east mainland Australia)
 Swift parrot (endemic as a breeding species, winters in eastern and south-east mainland Australia)
 Brown scrubwren
 Scrubtit
 Tasmanian thornbill
 Dusky robin
 Forty-spotted pardalote
 Yellow-throated honeyeater
 Black-headed honeyeater
 Strong-billed honeyeater
 Yellow wattlebird
 Black currawong

Species endemic to south-west Australia 

 Baudin's cockatoo
 Noisy scrub-bird
 Red-capped parrot
 Red-eared firetail
 Red-winged fairywren
 Carnaby's cockatoo
 Western bristlebird
 Western corella
 Western ground parrot
 Western rosella
 Western shrike-tit (often regarded as a subspecies of the crested shrike-tit)
 Western spinebill
 Western thornbill
 Western wattlebird
 White-breasted robin

Species endemic to north-west Australia 

 Black-banded fruit dove
 Black grasswren
 Red-lored whistler
 Hooded parrot
 Chestnut-backed buttonquail
 Chestnut-quilled rock pigeon
 Partridge pigeon
 Rainbow pitta
 Kimberley honeyeater
 White-lined honeyeater
 White-quilled rock pigeon
 White-throated grasswren
 Yellow-rumped munia

The chestnut rail is near-endemic to this region of Australia, elsewhere only being found on the Aru Islands.

Other endemics 

 Emu
 Malleefowl
 Stubble quail
 Chestnut teal
 Musk duck
 Cape Barren goose
 Maned duck
 Black swan
 Plumed whistling duck
 Pink-eared duck
 Blue-billed duck
 Australian shelduck
 Freckled duck
 Royal penguin (Macquarie Island endemic)
 Christmas Island frigatebird (Christmas Island endemic)
 Abbott's booby (Christmas Island endemic)
 Short-tailed shearwater (breeding endemic)
 Hoary-headed grebe (vagrant to New Zealand, has bred there)
 Yellow-billed spoonbill
 Black-faced cormorant
 Macquarie shag (Macquarie Island endemic)
 Heard Island shag (Heard Island endemic; sometimes considered a subspecies of the imperial shag)
 Nankeen kestrel (breeding endemic)
 Grey falcon
 Black falcon
 Black-shouldered kite
 Little eagle
 Red goshawk
 Black-breasted buzzard
 Square-tailed kite
 Black-tailed nativehen
 Lord Howe woodhen (Lord Howe Island endemic)
 Lord Howe swamphen (extinct—formerly endemic to Lord Howe Island)
 Australian crake
 Red-chested buttonquail
 Little buttonquail
 Red-necked avocet
 Banded stilt
 Sooty oystercatcher
 Banded lapwing
 Red-capped plover (formerly bred in New Zealand)
 Red-kneed dotterel
 Inland dotterel
 Hooded dotterel
 Plains wanderer
 Australian painted snipe
 Australian pratincole (breeding endemic)
 Pacific gull
 White-headed pigeon
 Brown cuckoo-dove (sometimes lumped with slender-billed cuckoo-dove)
 Common bronzewing
 Flock bronzewing
 Brush bronzewing
 Crested pigeon
 Spinifex pigeon
 Squatter pigeon
 Wonga pigeon
 Diamond dove
 Black-banded fruit-dove (until recently considered a subspecies of banded fruit-dove)
 Christmas imperial pigeon (Christmas Island endemic)
 Topknot pigeon
 Norfolk pigeon (extinct, formerly endemic to Norfolk Island)
 Horsfield's bronze cuckoo (breeding endemic)
 Black-eared cuckoo (breeding endemic)
 Pallid cuckoo (breeding endemic)
 Christmas boobook (Christmas Island endemic)
 Tawny frogmouth
 Spotted nightjar (breeding endemic)
 Australian swiftlet
 Laughing kookaburra
 Red-backed kingfisher
 Norfolk kaka (extinct, formerly endemic to Norfolk Island)
 Yellow-tailed black cockatoo
 Glossy black cockatoo
 Red-tailed black cockatoo
 Galah
 Major Mitchell's cockatoo
 Cockatiel
 Superb parrot
 Regent parrot
 Princess parrot
 Australian king parrot
 Eastern ground parrot
 Night parrot
 Bourke's parrot
 Blue-winged parrot
 Elegant parrot
 Rock parrot
 Scarlet-chested parrot
 Norfolk parakeet (Norfolk Island endemic)
 Macquarie parakeet (Extinct; formerly endemic to Macquarie Island)
 Lord Howe parakeet (Extinct; formerly endemic to Lord Howe Island)
 Australian ringneck (formerly split into mallee ringneck and Port Lincoln parrot; both subspecies are endemic)
 Crimson rosella
 Eastern rosella
 Northern rosella
 Pale-headed rosella
 Naretha bluebonnet (previously considered a subspecies of eastern bluebonnet)
 Red-rumped parrot
 Mulga parrot
 Paradise parrot (extinct)
 Musk lorikeet
 Little lorikeet
 Purple-crowned lorikeet
 Varied lorikeet
 Scaly-breasted lorikeet
 Budgerigar
 Spotted catbird
 Satin bowerbird
 Western bowerbird
 Spotted bowerbird
 Great bowerbird
 White-throated treecreeper
 White-browed treecreeper
 Red-browed treecreeper
 Brown treecreeper
 Rufous treecreeper
 Black-tailed treecreeper
 Grey grasswren
 Carpentarian grasswren
 Striated grasswren
 Short-tailed grasswren
 Eyrean grasswren
 Kalkadoon grasswren
 Dusky grasswren
 Thick-billed grasswren
 Western grasswren
 Southern emu-wren
 Mallee emu-wren
 Rufous-crowned emu-wren
 Splendid fairywren
 White-winged fairywren
 Red-backed fairywren
 Purple-crowned fairywren
 Superb fairywren
 Variegated fairywren
 Blue-breasted fairywren
 Eastern spinebill
 Pied honeyeater
 Lewin's honeyeater
 Graceful honeyeater
 Yellow honeyeater
 White-gaped honeyeater
 White-fronted honeyeater
 Yellow-faced honeyeater
 Yellow-tufted honeyeater
 Purple-gaped honeyeater
 Yellow-throated miner
 Black-eared miner
 Noisy miner
 Bell miner
 Eungella honeyeater
 Spiny-cheeked honeyeater
 Regent honeyeater
 Little wattlebird
 Red wattlebird
 Singing honeyeater
 Mangrove honeyeater
 Yellow-plumed honeyeater
 White-plumed honeyeater
 Fuscous honeyeater
 Grey-headed honeyeater
 Grey-fronted honeyeater
 Bar-breasted honeyeater
 Rufous-throated honeyeater
 Grey honeyeater
 Gibberbird
 Yellow chat
 Crimson chat
 Orange chat
 White-fronted chat
 Black honeyeater
 Scarlet myzomela
 Tawny-crowned honeyeater
 Banded honeyeater
 Crescent honeyeater
 New Holland honeyeater
 White-cheeked honeyeater
 White-eared honeyeater
 Gilbert's honeyeater
 White-naped honeyeater
 Brown-headed honeyeater
 Black-chinned honeyeater
 Macleay's honeyeater
 Striped honeyeater
 Painted honeyeater
 Silver-crowned friarbird
 Rufous bristlebird
 Spotted pardalote
 Striated pardalote
 Red-browed pardalote
 Rockwarbler
 Yellow-throated scrubwren
 White-browed scrubwren
 Large-billed scrubwren
 Redthroat
 Speckled warbler
 Rufous fieldwren
 Striated fieldwren
 Chestnut-rumped heathwren
 Shy heathwren
 Buff-rumped thornbill
 Slender-billed thornbill
 Brown thornbill
 Inland thornbill
 Yellow-rumped thornbill
 Chestnut-rumped thornbill
 Slaty-backed thornbill
 Yellow thornbill
 Striated thornbill
 Weebill
 Dusky gerygone
 Brown gerygone
 Western gerygone
 Norfolk gerygone (Norfolk Island endemic)
 Lord Howe gerygone (extinct; formerly endemic to Lord Howe Island)
 Southern whiteface
 Chestnut-breasted whiteface
 Banded whiteface
 White-browed babbler
 Hall's babbler
 Chestnut-crowned babbler
 Australian logrunner
 Eastern whipbird
 Western whipbird
 Chiming wedgebill
 Chirruping wedgebill
 Copperback quail-thrush
 Chestnut-breasted quail-thrush
 Western quail-thrush
 Cinnamon quail-thrush
 Nullarbor quail-thrush
 Yellow-breasted boatbill
 Masked woodswallow
 White-browed woodswallow
 Dusky woodswallow
 Little woodswallow
 Grey butcherbird
 Silver-backed butcherbird
 Pied butcherbird
 Pied currawong
 Grey currawong
 Ground cuckooshrike
 Crested shriketit (often split into northern shriketit, eastern shriketit, and western shriketit—all are endemic)
 Sandstone shrikethrush
 Bower's shrikethrush
 Olive whistler
 Gilbert's whistler
 White-breasted whistler
 Crested bellbird
 White-eared monarch
 Frill-necked monarch
 Restless flycatcher
 Little crow
 Australian raven
 Little raven
 Forest raven
 White-winged chough
 Apostlebird
 Scarlet robin
 Red-capped robin
 Flame robin
 Pink robin
 Hooded robin
 Eastern yellow robin
 Western yellow robin
 White-browed robin
 Buff-sided robin
 Northern scrub robin
 Southern scrub robin
 Fairy martin (breeding endemic)
 White-backed swallow
 Spinifexbird
 Brown songlark
 Rufous songlark
 Christmas white-eye (Christmas Island endemic)
 Canary white-eye
 Lord Howe silvereye (sometimes considered a subspecies of silvereye)
 Robust white-eye (extinct; formerly endemic to Lord Howe Island)
 Slender-billed white-eye (Norfolk Island endemic)
 White-chested white-eye (Norfolk Island endemic; likely extinct)
 Bassian thrush
 Tasman starling (extinct; formerly endemic to Norfolk Island and Lord Howe Island.  Some consider the Lord Howe starling and Norfolk starling separate species.)
 Painted firetail
 Beautiful firetail
 Diamond firetail
 Red-browed firetail
 Star finch
 Plum-headed finch
 Double-barred finch
 Masked finch
 Long-tailed finch
 Black-throated finch
 Gouldian finch
 Yellow-rumped mannikin
 Pictorella mannikin

Australia
 
Lists of birds of Australia